The following list of modern armament manufacturers presents major companies producing modern weapons and munitions for military, paramilitary, government agency and civilian use. The companies are listed by their full name followed by the short form, or common acronym, if any, in parentheses. The country the company is based in, if the information is available, follows that.

See also 
 Companies by arms sales
 List of firearm brands
 List of major arms industry corporations by country
 Military–industrial complex

Military corporations
 
Lists of manufacturers
Military lists
Manufacturers